Corné Bornman (born 5 February 1942) is a South African sports shooter. He competed in the mixed trap event at the 1992 Summer Olympics.

References

1942 births
Living people
South African male sport shooters
Olympic shooters of South Africa
Shooters at the 1992 Summer Olympics
Place of birth missing (living people)
20th-century South African people